The Black Butterfly is a lost 1916 American silent drama film starring Olga Petrova and released by Metro Pictures. The last known copy was destroyed in the 1965 MGM vault fire. Extant footage was posted online in 2019.

Cast
Olga Petrova as Sonia Smirnov/Marie, the convent girl
Mahlon Hamilton as Alan Hall
Anthony Merlo as Girard
Count Lewenhaupt as Lachaise
Edward Brennan as Lord Braislin
Violet Reed as Lady Constance Braislin
John Hopkins as Don Luis Maredo
Morgan Jones as Peter, father of Sonia
Norman Kerry as Vladimir (as Norman Kaiser)
Roy Pilcher as Gaston Duval
Evelyn Dumo as Ciel, Sonia's maid

References

External links

1916 films
American silent feature films
Lost American films
Films based on short fiction
Films directed by Burton L. King
1916 drama films
Silent American drama films
American black-and-white films
Films with screenplays by Lillian Case Russell
Metro Pictures films
1916 lost films
Lost drama films
1910s American films